Jhungian Mahansingh  is a village in Phillaur tehsil of Jalandhar District of Punjab State, India. It is located 12 km from Nagar, 7 km from postal head office Phillaur, 52 km from Jalandhar and 131 km from state capital Chandigarh. The village is administrated by a sarpanch who is an elected representative of village as per Panchayati raj (India).

Caste 
The village has schedule caste (SC) constitutes 67.16% of total population of the village and it doesn't have any Schedule Tribe (ST) population.

Transport

Rail 
Phillaur Junction is the nearest train station, however, Bhatian Railway Station is 16 km away from the village.

Air 
The nearest domestic airport is located 40 km away in Ludhiana and the nearest international airport is located in Chandigarh also a second nearest international airport is 147 km away in Amritsar.

References 

Villages in Jalandhar district
Villages in Phillaur tehsil